Quintus Fulvius Flaccus (c. 277 BC202 BC), son of Marcus Fulvius Flaccus (consul 264 BC), was consul in 237 BC, fighting the Gauls in northern Italy. He was censor in 231 BC, and again consul in 224 BC, when he subdued the Boii. He was a praetor in 215 BC and in 213 BC Master of Horse in the dictatorship of Gaius Claudius Centho.

He was again consul in 212 BC, during the Second Punic War, winning a victory over Hanno, son of Bomilcar and capturing his camp at Beneventum. He was defeated by Hannibal at the first Battle of Capua, then captured Capua in 211 BC while serving as a proconsul. In his fourth term as consul (209 BC), he retook Lucania and Bruttium. He opposed the African expedition of Scipio Africanus in 205 BC, and he died sometime not long thereafter.

Quintus Fulvius Flaccus was one of the three candidates for the position of Pontifex Maximus c. 212 BC, when he and another senior candidate Titus Manlius Torquatus, both former censors, were pipped at the post by a younger man, Publius Licinius Crassus who was not yet a curule aedile and thus probably aged in his middle thirties. Nevertheless, Flaccus made the new Pontifex his own Master of the Horse some years later.

Flaccus was known for his severity towards the disloyal citizens of Capua, of whom he had the senior men executed and the rest of the citizenry condemned to slavery for their disloyalty to Rome. According to Livy, the Capuans complained of his behavior to the Roman Senate, which, however, ruled that Flaccus was within his rights.

Flaccus was the grandfather of Marcus Fulvius Flaccus, consul in 125 BC, who was an ardent supporter of the Brothers Gracchi. He attempted to warn Tiberius Gracchus of the plots against his life on the day that he was killed; in 121 BC, having supported Gaius Gracchus in his reform program and tried to lead an armed resistance against the Senate, he and his elder son were tracked down and executed (beheaded) without trial on the orders of the consul Lucius Opimius; the youngest son, too young to have participated in any plotting or armed revolt, died in prison, again without trial (another son was apparently the father of Fulvia, third wife of Mark Antony). The grandfather, a stern conservative, could probably never have imagined the fates of his descendants.

See also 
 List of ancient Roman consuls

270s BC births
202 BC deaths
3rd-century BC Roman consuls
3rd-century BC Roman generals
3rd-century BC Roman praetors
Magistri equitum (Roman Republic)
Roman censors
Quintus consul 517 AUC
Year of birth uncertain